Smith's Gazelle is an adventure story  by Lionel Davidson. First edition published in the UK by Jonathan Cape in 1971. Cover design by Bill Botten.

Plot summary
An old Bedouin and two boys, one Jewish and the other Arab, have a miraculous adventure in the Israeli desert during the Six-Day War.

References

1971 British novels
English adventure novels
Novels set in Israel
Jonathan Cape books
Works about the Six-Day War
Fiction set in 1967